"One Time For Me" is a CD single by The Reverend Horton Heat. It was released in Australia in 1994 on Sub Pop/Interscope.

Track listing
 "One Time for Me" (Heath) - 3:30
 "Marijuana (live)" (Reverend Horton Heat)
 "Nurture My Pig (live)" (Locos Gringos)

Personnel
Jim "Reverend Horton" Heath - lead vocals, guitar
Jimbo Wallace - upright bass, vocals
Taz Bentley - drums, vocals
Al Jourgensen - producer

Chart positions

1994 singles
The Reverend Horton Heat songs
1994 songs
Sub Pop singles
Song recordings produced by Al Jourgensen